Sprotbrough and Cusworth is a civil parish in the metropolitan borough of Doncaster, South Yorkshire, England.  The parish contains 21 listed buildings that are recorded in the National Heritage List for England.  Of these, two are listed at Grade I, the highest of the three grades, and the others are at Grade II, the lowest grade.  The parish contains the villages of Sprotbrough and Cusworth, and the surrounding countryside.  In the parish is Cusworth Hall, which is listed together with associated structures in the grounds and in Cusworth Park.  The other listed buildings include two churches, a cross base, a farmhouse converted into a public house, the remains of a pump house, houses and associated structures, a mounting block, a village pump, a former toll house, and a telephone kiosk.


Key

Buildings

References

Citations

Sources

#

 

Lists of listed buildings in South Yorkshire
Buildings and structures in the Metropolitan Borough of Doncaster